Thai AirAsia is a joint venture of Malaysian low-fare airline AirAsia and Thailand's Asia Aviation. It serves AirAsia's regularly scheduled domestic and international flights from Bangkok and other cities in Thailand.

History
On 12 November 2003, AirAsia partnered with Shin Corporation to establish AirAsia Aviation Co. Ltd. (Thai AirAsia). It launched operations in February 2004 by launching flights from Bangkok–Don Mueang to Hat Yai, Phuket, and Chiang Mai.

On 15 February 2006, it was announced that Asia Aviation PLC (AAV), a registered Thai company, had taken Shin Corporation's 50 percent stake in Thai AirAsia. Asia Aviation was a joint venture set up by Shin Corporation, which held 49 percent of Asia Aviation's shares while 51 percent was held by Thai investor Sittichai Veerathammanoon.

In May 2007, Thai AirAsia's management acquired 100 percent of Asia Aviation. Thai AirAsia is 55 percent owned by Asia Aviation and 45 percent owned by Malaysia-based AirAsia Group. In June 2016 King Power purchased a US$225 million stake in Thai AirAsia. The purchase of 39 percent of holding company Asia Aviation makes King Power the second largest shareholder in Thai AirAsia. It sold back its shares to Asia Aviation a year later.

Thai AirAsia was once the only low-cost airline operating both domestic and international flights from Suvarnabhumi Airport in Bangkok, having moved there in 2007 from Don Mueang International Airport. However, the airline transferred all operations from Suvarnabhumi to Don Mueang on 1 October 2012. On 25 September 2020, Thai AirAsia resumed flights from Suvarnabhumi Airport.

Destinations

Fleet 

, Thai AirAsia operates the following aircraft:

Former fleet

Sponsorship
Thai AirAsia is one of the sponsors of the Thailand national football team, Leicester City, Queens Park Rangers, the Thai Fight Muay Thai, the Thai football teams BG Pathum United, Bangkok United, Buriram United, SCG Muangthong United, Chonburi, Rajpracha, Police Tero, Chainat, Sisaket, Samut Prakan City, Rajnavy FC, Ubon United, Air Force Central, Port, Udon Thani, Krabi, Nakhon Ratchasima, Ayutthaya United, Khon Kaen, MOF CUTD, Nakhon Phanom, Loei City, Trang, Phayao, Phuket City, The referee of FAT, Coke Cup and Thailand Volleyball Association.

Marketing
Thai AirAsia has endorsement deals with the following:
 Mum Jokmok
 Pleumjit Thinkaow
 Aed Carabao
 Nadech Kugimiya

References

External links

 AirAsia
 King Power

Airlines of Thailand
Airlines established in 2003
Low-cost carriers
AirAsia
Companies listed on the Stock Exchange of Thailand
Companies based in Bangkok
Thai companies established in 2003